The Bridge of Mantible (Spanish: Puente Romano de Mantible) is a ruined bridge located near Logroño, Spain. It crosses the Ebro river between La Rioja and the Basque Country, connecting El Cortijo and Assa.

According to some historians, construction of the bridge began in the first half of the 2nd century, well into Rome's imperial period. Others suggest that the bridge was built in the 11th century, near the same time in which the Puente La Reina was constructed over the River Arga, and that both were made to join the two most important cities of the Kingdom of Navarre, Nájera and Pamplona.

Neither theory makes clear at what point the bridge became no longer passable, but there are documents that suggest that it had already fully deteriorated by halfway through the 16th century.

The bridge is 164 meters long, 5 meters wide and reaches a maximum height of 30 meters. It was built with seven semicircular arches, only two of which stand relatively intact today. There are only a few remains of the other five arches. The two standing arches serve as an example of the excellent quarry stone used in the bridge.

It was declared Bien de Interés Cultural in 1983.

References

External links 

Bien de Interés Cultural landmarks in La Rioja (Spain)
Bridges in La Rioja (Spain)
Ruined bridges
Ruins in Spain
2nd-century establishments in the Roman Empire
2nd-century establishments
11th-century establishments in Spain
16th-century disestablishments in Spain
Bien de Interés Cultural landmarks in Álava